The Atlas H was an American expendable launch system derived from the SM-65 Atlas missile. It was a member of the Atlas family of rockets, and was used to launch five clusters of NOSS satellites for the US National Reconnaissance Office. Two flights also carried LiPS satellites, as secondary payloads for the United States Naval Research Laboratory.

The Atlas H was a stage and a half rocket, using the enhanced Atlas rocket designed for use as the first stage of the Atlas G rocket, which differed from the Atlas H in having a Centaur upper stage. This stage was later reused as the first stage of the Atlas I. In practice, an MSD upper stage was flown on all five launches.

Atlas H could put a payload of 3,630 kg (8,000 lb) into low Earth orbit, or a payload of 2,255 kg (4,971 lb) into a geostationary transfer orbit.

References

Rockets and missiles
Atlas (rocket family)